The Golden Cup is one Roller Hockey tournament disputed all years in the city of Blanes, Catalonia. The first edition was in 2004.

Historical

Men's

Women's

Winners

Men's

Women's

References

External links
Official website of 2011 Edition
Blanes Hoquei Club
Catalan Federation

Roller hockey competitions
Sports competitions in Catalonia
Rink hockey in Catalonia